Karl Hermann Jeschke (born August 17, 1890, date of death unknown) was an SS-Oberscharführer and member of staff at Auschwitz concentration camp. He was prosecuted at the Auschwitz Trial.

Jeschke was born in Hohenliebenthal. He joined the Nazi Party in 1933. He served in the Wehrmacht fighting on the front until 1944. In July 1944 he was drafted into the Waffen-SS and sent to Auschwitz, where he worked as a guard. In mid-September 1944 he was transferred to the Charlottengrube subcamp.

After World War II, Jeschke was tried by the Supreme National Tribunal in Kraków. He received a three-year prison sentence. His subsequent whereabouts are unknown.

Bibliography 
 Cyprian T., Sawicki J., Siedem wyroków Najwyższego Trybunału Narodowego, Poznań 1962

References

1890 births
Year of death missing
German military personnel of World War II
People convicted in the Auschwitz trial
SS non-commissioned officers
Auschwitz concentration camp personnel
German people convicted of crimes against humanity